Hornbeak is a town in Obion County, Tennessee, United States. The population was 424 as of the 2010 census. It is part of the Union City, TN–KY Micropolitan Statistical Area. Hornbeak was originally known as Wilsonville, not to be confused with the settlement of the same name in Cocke County. It was renamed Hornbeak after the owner of the town's general store, Frank Hornbeak.

Geography
Hornbeak is located at  (36.333879, -89.299292).

Demographics

As of the census of 2000, there were 435 people, 185 households, and 130 families residing in the town. The racial makeup of the town was 99.31% White, 0.23% African American, and 0.46% from two or more races.

There were 185 households, out of which 30.8% had children under the age of 18 living with them, 59.5% were married couples living together, 7.0% had a female householder with no husband present, and 29.2% were non-families. 25.9% of all households were made up of individuals, and 13.5% had someone living alone who was 65 years of age or older. The average household size was 2.35 and the average family size was 2.81.

In the town, the population was spread out, with 22.8% under the age of 18, 7.1% from 18 to 24, 29.0% from 25 to 44, 23.7% from 45 to 64, and 17.5% who were 65 years of age or older. The median age was 40 years. For every 100 females, there were 87.5 males. For every 100 females age 18 and over, there were 89.8 males.

The median income for a household in the town was $27,153, and the median income for a family was $31,389. Males had a median income of $29,167 versus $20,313 for females. The per capita income for the town was $11,657. About 13.5% of families and 14.7% of the population were below the poverty line, including 3.9% of those under age 18 and 26.5% of those age 65 or over.

Racial History
The Riders
|1906

During the attempts to privately control Reelfoot Lake in 1906, “The Night Riders” came to the nearby town of Hornbeak and gave all the black families notice to get out. The Riders stated that when they returned any black still there would be killed. True to their word, The Riders returned the next day and rounded up all the black males they could find in short notice. They were mostly shot, a few hanged but all buried on private land, alongside State road 21, just inside the East current city limits on the North side. The women and children were spared, and all quickly relocated.
For many years following the killings, the victims families visited on the weekend. As late as 1930 my mom witnessed them. They picnicked and kept the graves clean but after several years the owner fenced the land and bulldozed any markers that remained. 
My mother took me to the location in 1960 and pointed it out so that it would not be forgotten. (36.3400347, -89.2753623) 
My grandmother acknowledged having seen the acts, saying “I’ve seen The Riders and I’ve seen what they do!”, but refusing to speak further, visibly still shaken, after over 60 years.

Media
Radio Stations
 WENK-AM 1240 - "The Greatest Hits of All Time"
 WWGY 99.3 - "Today's Best Music with Ace & TJ in the Morning"

References

External links

Towns in Obion County, Tennessee
Towns in Tennessee
Union City, Tennessee micropolitan area